Aub is a city in the district of Würzburg, in Bavaria, Germany.

The river Gollach is the main body of water. Aub is divided into three parts: Aub, Baldersheim, and Burgerroth.

History
The earlier territory of the Catholic Church in Würzburg became part of Bavaria when the government was secularized in 1805. The present municipality was created during the administrative reforms of 2010.

Population
The population has remained relatively stable since 1970, as shown in the following table:

Administrative municipality
Aub forms an administrative municipality with the nearby towns of Gelchsheim and Sonderhofen.

Sister city
  Wrixum, Schleswig-Holstein

Landmarks
Aub has a beautiful church and a well-kept Jewish cemetery.
The main church has a very fine carved wooden altarpiece by Tilman Riemenschneider, who was an important master sculptor in Southern Germany in the late Middle Ages.
The town has most of its medieval walls intact, and an interesting small museum in the 'spittalkirche', a medieval monastery-cum-hospice, which served pilgrims and the old and infirm. Today the museum has objects from Aub's past, and displays about caring for the elderly through the centuries (all in German).
Aub is the second smallest city in Bavaria. It has a bank, two bakery-cum-cafes, a doctor and a hairdresser.
The countryside is very pleasant to cycle around. There is a cycle track along the disused railway line that leads to the Tauber valley, which is quite picturesque.
'Kunegonde Kapelle', named after an early medieval queen-saint, is located outside of the city. The key to the chapel can be obtained from the nearby village. The chapel is very atmospheric inside. In the wall of the old church yard a (reputedly) 1,000-year-old pollarded lime tree still stands.
When the Catholic Church is celebrating a major festival, the townsfolk dress up in medieval costume, the town band plays, and there is a fair with dodgem cars and American Line dancing in the evening, or a medieval fair with jousting in the grounds of the hunting lodge at the top of the town.

Personalites 

 Max Aub (1903-1972), novelist and playwright, was not from Aub, but he is, as well as the rabbi Joseph Aub, a descendant of Abraham Meyer from Aub
 Johannes Böhm (1485-1533/1535), German humanist
 Johann Adam Schmidt (1759-1809), doctor of Ludwig van Beethoven 
 Kaspar Bausewein (1838-1903), singer at the Munich Court Opera
 Konrad Hoos (1892-1982), priest, ecclesiastic council study professor, honorary citizen of Baldersheim

References

External links
Official website

Würzburg (district)